Pablo Barrios (born 14 July 1964) is a Venezuelan Olympic show jumping rider. Representing Venezuela, he competed at two Summer Olympics (in 2008 and 2016). His best Olympic result came in 2008 when he placed 40th individually.

Barrios competed at four World Equestrian Games (in 1998, 2006, 2010 and 2014) and at the 2011 edition of Show Jumping World Cup finals. He also participated at several regional games, including four Pan American Games.

References

Living people
1964 births
Venezuelan male equestrians
Equestrians at the 2008 Summer Olympics
Equestrians at the 2016 Summer Olympics
Equestrians at the 1983 Pan American Games
Equestrians at the 2007 Pan American Games
Equestrians at the 2011 Pan American Games
Equestrians at the 2015 Pan American Games
Olympic equestrians of Venezuela
Pan American Games competitors for Venezuela
Central American and Caribbean Games gold medalists for Venezuela
Central American and Caribbean Games bronze medalists for Venezuela
Competitors at the 2010 Central American and Caribbean Games
Competitors at the 2014 Central American and Caribbean Games
Central American and Caribbean Games medalists in equestrian